Werner Camichel (26 January 1945 – 27 March 2006 in Samaden) is a Swiss bobsledder who competed in the 1970s. He won the gold medal in the four-man event at the 1972 Winter Olympics in Sapporo.

Camichel also won two gold medals in the four-man event at the FIBT World Championships, winning them in 1973 and 1975.

Camichel carried the Swiss flag during the opening ceremonies of the 1976 Winter Olympics in Innsbruck. He later managed the bobsleigh, luge, and skeleton track in St. Moritz.

Camichel died from cancer in 2006.

His sons Corsin Camichel and Duri Camichel were ice hockey players.

References

External links
 Bobsleigh four-man Olympic medalists for 1924, 1932–56, and since 1964
 Bobsleigh four-man world championship medalists since 1930
 
 
 
 FIL-Luge news on Carmichel's death. – Accessed 24 November 2007.

1945 births
2006 deaths
Bobsledders at the 1972 Winter Olympics
Swiss male bobsledders
Olympic bobsledders of Switzerland
Olympic gold medalists for Switzerland
Olympic medalists in bobsleigh
Medalists at the 1972 Winter Olympics
Deaths from cancer in Switzerland
20th-century Swiss people